Olkhovsky is a rural locality (a khutor) in Tishanskoye Rural Settlement, Nekhayevsky District, Volgograd Oblast, Russia. The population was 21 as of 2010.

Geography 
Olkhovsky is located 12 km northeast of Nekhayevskaya (the district's administrative centre) by road. Atamanovsky is the nearest rural locality.

References 

Rural localities in Nekhayevsky District